Language Acquisition: A Journal of Developmental Linguistics is an American peer-reviewed journal in psycholinguistics that has been published quarterly since 1990. It is mainly devoted to studies of language acquisition that are informed by, and relevant to, current research in generative linguistics. Its founding co-editors were Robert Berwick, Thomas Roeper, and Kenneth Wexler. From 2003 to 2011 it was co-edited by Diane Lillo-Martin and William Snyder (both from University of Connecticut). The current editor is Jeffrey Lidz from the University of Maryland. The journal, which is available online with subscription, was published by Lawrence Erlbaum Associates from 1990 until 2007, and is now published by Psychology Press, part of the Taylor & Francis Group.

See also
List of applied linguistics journals
Linguistics journals
Publications established in 1990